Flavocrambus striatellus is a moth in the family Crambidae. It was described by John Henry Leech in 1889. It is found in Japan (Honshu) and Korea.

References

Crambinae
Moths described in 1889